Worlds' Finest is a comic book published by DC Comics, a reimagining of the classic World's Finest Comics, with a similar name but a differently-placed apostrophe. It was launched in May 2012 with a July 2012 cover date. The series was part of a second wave of The New 52 reboot and was one of six titles replacing previously cancelled titles.

Publication history
Written by Paul Levitz and drawn by George Pérez and Kevin Maguire, the series stars the Huntress and Power Girl. In the first issue, the two heroines are established as being from Earth 2, where they used the codenames Robin and Supergirl, respectively, and having accidentally been exiled to the main DC Universe.

The Huntress, the daughter of Earth 2's Batman, has maintained a heroic identity for some time. The first issue reveals that Helena Bertinelli has been dead for a long time and that Helena Wayne has been using her identity, as seen in the 2011–2012 Huntress miniseries. Power Girl, in contrast, has functioned solely in her civilian identity of Karen Starr, as a billionaire industrialist using her ownership of Starr Labs as a cover to try to discover a way for them to return home. After a Starr Labs subsidiary in Japan is destroyed, Karen adopts the superhero identity of Power Girl to fight alongside the Huntress.

The two eventually succeed in returning to Earth 2, and with issue #27 (Dec. 2014) the series began to feature the Superman and Batman of Earth 2 as the main characters. The series was cancelled as of issue #32 (May 2015) which went on sale in March.

Collected editions

Notes

References

External links
 
 Worlds' Finest at Mike's Amazing World of Comics

2012 comics debuts
Comics by George Pérez
Comics by Paul Levitz
DC Comics titles
Defunct American comics
Superhero comics
Team-up comics